Biltine (Arabic: بلتن) is a city in Chad, and the capital of Wadi Fira region (previously Biltine prefecture).

The town was briefly captured on November 25, 2006, by the RADF, a rebel group, then recaptured the next day by the government, along with nearby Abéché that had been captured by a different rebel group, the UFDD. On June 16, 2008, the town was the scene of a battle between rebels on government forces, with the rebels said to have won.

The town is served by Biltine Airport.

Demographics

References

Wadi Fira Region
Populated places in Chad